"Sister Moon" was Transvision Vamp's fifth single release and the final single to be taken from their debut album Pop Art. It was a minor hit on the UK Singles Chart in 1988, peaking at #41.

In Australia, "Sister Moon" was released in 1989 as the fourth and final single from the album, following "Tell That Girl to Shut Up".

Track listing
7" vinyl (TVV 5 / TVVP 5) 
"Sister Moon" (7" version) - 3:58
"Oh Yeah" (Anthony Doughty) / (Dave Parsons) - 2:52
"Walk on By" (Pol Burton) - 3:23

A limited edition 7" picture disc was also released (TVVP 5).

12" vinyl (TVVT 5) 
"Sister Moon" (Groove On) - 6:08
"Walk on By" - 3:23
"Sex Kick" (Ciao Portobello) - 7:19
"Oh Yeah" - 2:52

CD single (DTVV 5) 
"Sister Moon" (7" version) - 3:58
"Oh Yeah" - 2:52
"Walk on By" - 3:23
"Sex Kick" (Ciao Portobello) - 7:19

Charts

References

External links
Worldwide releases

1988 singles
Transvision Vamp songs
1988 songs
MCA Records singles